The 1991 European Tour, titled as the 1991 Volvo Tour for sponsorship reasons, was the 20th official season of golf tournaments known as the PGA European Tour.

The season was originally made up of 38 tournaments counting for the Order of Merit, and eight non-counting "Approved Special Events".

The Order of Merit was won by Spain's Seve Ballesteros for the sixth time, having previously won in 1976, 1977, 1978, 1986 and 1988.

Changes for 1991
There were several changes from the previous season, with the return of both the Catalan Open and the Jersey Open; the addition of the Girona Open; the loss of the Tenerife Open; and the Scandinavian Enterprise Open and the PLM Open were merged to create the Scandinavian Masters.

After provisionally being scheduled for 14–17 October, the Portuguese Open was moved to 21–24 March, taking the venue and dates of the Atlantic Open, which was lost from the calendar. Also before the season started, three more tournaments were removed from the schedule; the Dubai Desert Classic was cancelled due to the Gulf War, the El Bosque Open was cancelled due to lack of sponsorship, and the AGF Open was cancelled as sponsors sought to replace the event's promotion company. These changes resulted in a reduction to 34 counting tournaments for the Order of Merit.

Schedule
The following table lists official events during the 1991 season.

Unofficial events
The following events were sanctioned by the European Tour, but did not carry official money, nor were wins official.

Order of Merit
The Order of Merit was titled as the Volvo Order of Merit and was based on prize money won during the season, calculated in Pound sterling.

Awards

See also
List of golfers with most European Tour wins

Notes

References

External links
1991 season results on the PGA European Tour website
1991 Order of Merit on the PGA European Tour website

European Tour seasons
European Tour